Roche Jacques is a mountain in the Alberta's Rockies of Canada.

The mountain is located south of Highway 16 and Talbot Lake in Jasper National Park. It is part of the Jacques Range, and is situated immediately southeast of Cinquefoil Mountain, between the Jacques Creek and Cinquefoil Creek valleys.

The mountain was named after Jacques Cardinal, a North West Company employee.

References 

Alberta's Rockies
Two-thousanders of Alberta